Blue's Clues is an American children's television series airing on the Nickelodeon family of channels. The series takes place inside a world in which everything is made of paper cutouts, clay, and other craft materials. It is presented by a live-action human host who lives in a yellow house inhabited by anthropomorphic everyday objects.

Steve Burns hosted the series from its debut in 1996 until 2002, when the part was taken over by Donovan Patton. The program features an ensemble cast of animated characters who interact with the host. Co-creator Traci Paige Johnson voices the title character, a dog named Blue who communicates through distinctive barks. The series' composers Michael Rubin and Nick Balaban voiced Mailbox and Mr. Salt, respectively.

In addition to the main characters, the show included various newly-introduced recurring characters and guest stars throughout its run. Some guests appeared as live-action companions of the host, while others voiced an animated cameo role. When a spin-off series titled Blue's Room premiered in 2004, a group of puppet characters were introduced as new friends of Blue. A reboot titled Blue's Clues & You! premiered in 2019, with Joshua Dela Cruz as the new host.

Main

Blue
Blue (voiced by Traci Paige Johnson in Blue's Clues and Victoria Potencorvo and puppeteered by Leslie Carrara-Rudolph in Blue's Room) is a playful and energetic 5-year-old female dog with light blue fur and dark blue spots. She cannot talk but communicates with her owners, Steve, Joe, and Josh, through barks that they interpret based on her tone and expression. In each episode, she plays a game called Blue's Clues, in which she leaves three blue paw print clues for the host and viewers to find in order to answer a question. She has the ability to enter storybooks and picture frames by "skidooing" into them with a special dance routine. In the sixth season, she is granted a magic playroom called Blue's Room in which she can interact with the viewer and a cast of live-action puppet characters. In most animated appearances, she is one of the series' creators. Johnson was cast as the character's voice because out of the crew, she was able to sound the most like a dog.

Steve
Steve (played by Steve Burns) is the host for the show's first four seasons (and one of the former hosts of the Blue's Clues franchise). He is Blue's owner and caregiver. He wears a distinctive green-striped long-sleeve polo shirt with khakis and brown shoes. He loves anything that has a similar pattern. He's intelligent, energetic, friendly, clever, helpful and sympathetic but sometimes clumsy, wild, impulsive, and forgetful. Steve and Blue are best friends. He's always excited and prepared to play Blue's Clues, but can almost never find clues himself and relies on the viewer to help locate them. Whenever he finds a clue, he draws it in a pocket-sized pad of paper called the Handy Dandy Notebook. When he finishes a game of Blue's Clues, he sits in a giant red armchair called the Thinking Chair and comes up with possible solutions to Blue's puzzles. Within the first two seasons (some in the second), he would give out wrong and silly answers during thinking time, much to Blue's dismay, even in "Blue's Big Musical", "Blue's Big Costume Party", and "Blocks". His favorite time of the day is mail time when he receives a letter from Mailbox. He owns a stuffed anteater named Horace, which indicates that anteaters are also his favorite animal. At the end of the fourth season, Steve becomes the mentor to his younger brother, Joe, because he teaches him to play "Blue's Clues" in the episode "Joe Gets a Clue" and after that, leaves for college on a hopscotch scholarship and leaves Joe to take care of his house and Blue. There, he becomes the varsity captain for the hopscotch team at his college as revealed in the 100th episode special. In the reboot series Blue's Clues & You!, Steve has since graduated and now runs the Blueprints Detective Agency (BDA) and appears as a recurring character. He is the one that most countries dubbed or replaced (there are three countries known for Steve replacement, first in UK, where British TV personality Kevin Duala got the role, second in Portugal, third in Korea).

Joe
Joe (played by Donovan Patton) is the host of the show's fifth and sixth seasons (and another one of the former hosts of the Blue's Clues franchise). He is Steve's younger, taller brother and his Blue's Clues-playing apprentice who stays at the Blue's Clues house after Steve leaves for college. He wears a variety of different colored shirts with a horizontal line of squares on the front. In each of Joe's episodes, he alternates between colors (red, yellow, green, orange, purple, and blue). His favorite toy is a stuffed duck named Boris. He owns a Handy Dandy Notebook similar to Steve's, but it is larger and shaped like the Thinking Chair. In later episodes of Season 5 and 6, Joe normally does not draw clues in his notebook and instead watches magically-animated versions of the clues appear. Although sometimes silly and younger than Steve, he seems to be more mature and straight-talking as he never gave out wrong answers during thinking time thanks to Steve advising him not to give out wrong answers. In the reboot series Blue's Clues & You!, Joe now runs the Present Store and appears as a recurring character.

Josh
Josh (played by Joshua Dela Cruz) is the host of the revival series Blue's Clues & You! and the current host of the franchise. He is Steve and Joe's younger cousin and a talented singer. Josh's double-sided Handy Dandy Notebook has a phone on the other side, which he uses to communicate with the other characters. He is of Filipino descent as revealed in "Blue's Big Baking Show". Josh's favorite color is blue, and he wears a long sleeved blue striped shirt, blue jeans and blue sneakers with red laces. Josh plays an acoustic guitar in nearly every episode, his guitar has red swirls on it similar to those on the thinking chair. Josh is easily excited and, like Steve, occasionally gives out wrong answers to Blue's Clues before coming up with the correct answer much to Blue's amusement.

Mailbox
Mailbox (Postbox in the UK) (voiced by Michael Rubin, who is normally credited under the stage name Seth O'Hickory in the US version. Kara Tritton in the UK version in the original series and Doug Murray in the reboot series) is a cheerful and purple 10-year-old mailbox who lives at the foot of the pathway in front of the Blue's Clues house. In each episode, Mailbox delivers a letter or informing an incoming e-mail after the host sings a special song called "Mailtime" and sits on the Thinking Chair. His letters contain video messages from children around the world that relate to the episode's topic. Mailbox has a thick Brooklyn accent and likes to crack jokes. He wants to be a comedian when he grows up and has a collection of postage stamps. Although he is normally stationed on a stake in the ground, he can use an "extendo" arm to move anywhere around the house or the backyard.

Sidetable Drawer
Sidetable Drawer (voiced by Aleisha LaNae Allen in the orignal series and Liyou Abera in the reboot series from 2019-2020 and by Shazdeh Kapadia since 2020) is the 5-year-old keeper of the Handy Dandy Notebook. She lives in the living room to the left of the Thinking Chair. Whenever Steve or Joe starts a game of Blue's Clues, they must go to Sidetable and ask her for their notebook. She usually has Steve's telephone on top of her and holds an assortment of useful items in her drawer, depending on the situation. She is a talented singer and enjoys performing on stage. However, she is shy and sometimes lets her lack of confidence prevent her from singing in front of others. She has been known to be sad whenever someone doesn't say "please", as proven in the episode "Blue's Sad Day". Sidetable likes all kinds of music. Unlike the other characters, Sidetable has an inanimate form without a face that is seen whenever she is not speaking. In the reboot series, her tabletop is square and gains a wooden texture.

The Spice Family
The Spice Family are a group of condiment dispensers who live in the kitchen, each named after the type of spice they contain.
Mr. Salt (voiced by Nick Balaban in the original series and Brad Adamson in the reboot series) is of French heritage and acts as the homemaker of the Blue's Clues house. He takes care of the other residents and prepares food for them. He and his wife Mrs. Pepper come from Paris, where they worked as cooks. Despite his experience as a chef, Mr. Salt is prone to accidents in the kitchen and often needs the host's help when he is baking.
Mrs. Pepper (voiced by Penelope Jewkes during the first season and by Spencer Kayden for the remainder of the original series and by Giesle Rosseau in the reboot series) is the mother figure of the Blue's Clues house. She spends much of her time caring for Paprika and Cinnamon. In her free time, she likes to sing with Mr. Salt and swim in the kitchen sink. She is commonly shown holding Cinnamon in her arms while Mr. Salt holds Paprika.
Paprika (voiced by Jenna Marie Castle as a baby and by Corrine Hoffman as a toddler in the original series and by Shechinah Mpumlwana in the reboot series from 2019-2020 and is currently voiced by Abigail Nicholson since 2020) is Mr. Salt and Mrs. Pepper's daughter. She first appears in "Blue's News". In the first three seasons, she is a baby and only speaks in incomplete sentences. She has an orange gummy teddy bear and sleeps in a crib made from a peanut. In the fourth season, Paprika becomes a toddler and prepares to be a responsible sibling after the announcement of Mrs. Pepper's second child. In the reboot series, she gets older and is now a preteen.
Cinnamon (voiced by Nick Balaban's daughter, Annalivia Balaban in the original series, Jaiden Cannatelli from 2019-2020 and currently by Niko Ceci since 2020 in the reboot series) is Mr. Salt and Mrs. Pepper's son, who is introduced over a five-episode story arc during the fourth season. He has several hand-me-down playthings from Paprika and a purple rattle, which is his favorite toy. When Paprika helps teach him how to do things, she learns more about herself and her role as his older sister. In the reboot series, he gets older and has a more clearer and deeper voice.
Sage and Ginger are Mr. Salt and Mrs. Pepper's newborn fraternal twins, who debut in Blue's Clues & You!. They first appear in "Big News with Blue". They are both short bottles with faces, arms, and cork caps. Sage is a boy whose bottle is colored green and Ginger is a girl whose bottle is colored light brown.

Shovel and Pail
Shovel (voiced by Stephen Schmidt from 1996-2001, by Jonhathan Press from 2001-2003, and by Thomas Sharkey in the original series and by Leo Orgil from 2019-2022 and currently by Nathan Sayavong in the reboot series) and Pail (voiced by Marshall Claffy from 1996-2001, by Julia Wetherell from 2001-2003, and by Nicole Gibson in 2004 in the original series and by Jordana Blake in the reboot series) are a 6-year-old brother and sister, respectively, who live in the garden of the Blue's Clues house. They first appear in "Blue's Story Time". They accompany Steve or Joe whenever a game of Blue's Clues leads them outside to the backyard. Their favorite activity is building sand castles together in the sand table. They love learning about the different types of animals that live outside. They both dream of becoming veterinarians when they grow up. Their color schemes parallel each other's; Shovel is yellow with a red mouth, while Pail is red with a yellow mouth.

Tickety Tock
Tickety Tock (known as Tickety for short) (voiced by Kathryn Avery from 1996-2001 and by Kelly Nigh from 2001-2004 in the original series and by Ava Augstin in the reboot series) is a 5-year-old alarm clock who lives on a nightstand in the bedroom of the Blue's Clues house. The '12' mark on her face is usually replaced by a symbol that relates to the episode's topic. She loves counting different things and often invites the host and the viewers to help her with basic math. Tickety is very number-oriented and likes to keep schedules. She is responsible for waking the residents of the Blue's Clues house every morning by ringing her bells. She is best friends with Slippery.

Slippery Soap
Slippery Soap (known as Slippery for short) (voiced by Cody Ross Pits from 1996-2001, Patrick Van Wagenen from 2001-2003 and Sean Hanley in 2004 in the original series and Jacob Soley in the reboot series) is a 5-year-old lavender-colored bar of soap who lives in the bathroom of the Blue's Clues house. He often has trouble standing upright and is known for shouting his catchphrase "Whoa!" whenever he slides around. He first appears in "What Does Blue Need?". He is always surrounded by a trail of bubbles. He dreams of becoming the captain of a boat when he grows up and likes to wear a blue sailor cap with an anchor emblem on it. He is best friends with Tickety. Slippery is a mostly light lavender rectangular bar of soap that has rounded edges, a smaller-shaped dent in the front and back, and a pair of arms with three fingers on each hand. He has a pair of black eyes and a pink mouth. He is always surrounded at the bottom by a trail of translucent bubbles of various colors (usually purple). In the original series, Slippery, Shovel, and Pail were the only main non-human characters with permanent eyebrows.

Magenta
Magenta (voiced by Koyalee Chanda in the original series and Diane Salema in the reboot series) is Blue's best friend, who is the same age as Blue and identical to her with the exception of a magenta fur coat and glasses. She is first shown in the episode "Blue's Story Time" but is not properly introduced until "Magenta Comes Over". She is one of Blue's classmates at school and has visited the Blue's Clues house on special occasions. Magenta is shyer than Blue but shares the same playful and energetic attitude.

Periwinkle
Periwinkle (voiced by Cameron Bowen from 2000-2001, by Kenny Jim from 2001-2003, and by Jansen Panettiere in 2004 and Luxton Handspiker from 2021-2022 and currently by Peter Laurie in the reboot series) is a precocious 5-year-old male kitten from the city. In "Blue's Big Mystery", he makes his debut. His hobbies include performing magic tricks, putting on shows, and building forts. He is very outgoing and can speak unlike most of the other animal characters. He is in a long-distance friendship with a purple bird from the city named Plum. He is a bilingual speaker.

Rainbow Puppy
Rainbow Puppy (voiced by Brianna Bryan) is a rainbow-colored dog who appears as Blue's new neighbor in Blue's Clues & You!. She is a charismatic, confident puppy from the city.

Supporting

The Felt Friends are a group of children made entirely of geometric felt shapes. They live in a world that Blue and the host can enter by "skidooing" into a picture frame in the Blue's Clues house. They often ask for the host's help when they need to count, build, or fix something constructed with felt shapes. Many of the Felt Friends' names start with the letter F.
Turquoise is Blue's pet turtle, who has a light blue shell with dark blue pentagonal shapes on it. She debuts in the season two episode "Blue's Birthday" when Steve gives her to Blue as a special birthday present. Turquoise appears sporadically in episodes afterwards, normally in a small glass terrarium on the bedroom shelf.
The snail is a pink garden snail who appears hidden in three scenes of every episode. His appearances are intended as Easter eggs for viewers to look for. The snail is rarely addressed directly or acknowledged by the main characters. He makes a guest appearance during the final musical number in Blue's Big Musical Movie, in which he sings while riding a skateboard and reveals himself to have a loud, deep voice. In the spin-off series Blue's Room, the snail appears as a stuffed animal in the background.
Miranda portrayed by.  Miranda's owner.
Grandma Cayenne is family member of spice family

Minor
Baby Bear is a young female bear cub from the storybook "Goldilocks and the Three Bears". After Blue and Steve visit her story in "Blue's Story Time", she becomes a recurring friend of Blue and visits the main characters on special occasions. She lives with her parents Papa Bear and Mama Bear. Her catchphrase is "I'm not tired!"
Gingerbread Boy is a talking gingerbread cookie who lives in a board game similar to Candy Land. Blue and Steve occasionally "skidoo" into his game to visit him. He first appeared in "Blue Wants to Play a Game". He has a sister, Gingerbread Girl, who appears in the episode "Geography".
Green Puppy (voiced by Adam Peltzman) is one of Blue's schoolmates, a 5-year-old mint green bulldog who communicates through gruff barks. Her first appearance was "Blue's Sad Day". Unlike the other dogs featured in the series, Green Puppy is depicted with visible teeth incisors and has short ears. Green Puppy is playful but she can be a bit rough.
Miranda (played by Shannon Walker Williams) is Magenta's owner and Steve's friend. She wears a red long-sleeved sweater with black pants and red shoes. She is the only person other than Steve, Joe, and Josh to use the Thinking Chair, which she shares with Steve in "Shy".
Marlee Matlin plays herself as a live-action librarian who only appears in the episodes "Blue's Book Nook" and "Our Neighborhood Festival," and the Steve and Marlee promos. She appears to be deaf and silent, but can read people's lips and communicates through sign language.
Miss Marigold is the teacher of Blue's preschool class who appears in three episodes. Unlike most of the other humans on the show, she is not portrayed by a live-action actor but is animated. In the reboot, she is a pink, anthropomorphic hippopotamus with a flower on top of her head.
Orange Kitten (voiced by Cailtin Hale) is a 5-year-old kitten who attends Blue's preschool class. She made her first appearance in "Blue's Sad Day".
Purple Kangaroo (voiced by Alexander Claffy) is a 5-year-old soft-spoken lavender-colored kangaroo who also attends Blue's preschool class. He first appears in "Blue's Sad Day".
Steve's grandmother is the grandmother of Steve and Joe, who wears a green striped dress similar to Steve's shirt. She lives next door to the Blue's Clues house and is occasionally mentioned by Steve. Her only physical appearance is in "Blue's Big Treasure Hunt", wherein she was played by Rue McClanahan.
Wynonna (played by herself) and is Green Puppy's owner and Steve's friend; she and Green Puppy celebrate Christmas. Like most of Steve's live-action friends, she is only shown in one of the Christmas specials, "Blue's Big Holiday".
Tyrese (played by himself) is Purple Kangaroo's owner and Steve's friend; he and Purple Kangaroo celebrate Kwanzaa. Like most of Steve's live-action friends, he is only shown in one of the Christmas specials, "Blue's Big Holiday". 
Sam (played by Lisa Datz) is Orange Kitten's owner and Steve's friend; she and Orange Kitten celebrate Hanukkah. Like most of Steve's live-action friends, she is only shown in one of the Christmas specials, "Blue's Big Holiday".
Sifter is a close friend of Shovel and Pail. His favorite hobby is basketball. 
Plum is a small purple bird and an old friend of Periwinkle's from the city. He's also fluent in speaking Spanish.
Lola (played by Carolyn Fe) is Josh's grandmother from the Philippines. She has appeared in "Blue's Big Baking Show" as the answer to Blue's Clues, and in the Mailtime segment of "Sleepy Singalong with Blue". She has also appeared in some digital content released on the Blue's Clue's & You YouTube channel singing songs with Josh in English and Tagalog.
Aly (played by Izzy Nagel) is Periwinkle's owner; she never appeared or was mentioned in the original series until her debut in the "A Blue's Clues Festival of Lights" in the reboot series.
Mauve (voiced by Rex Hagon) is a pink adult cat and Periwinkle's grandfather. He makes his first appearance in "A Blue's Clues Festival of Lights", where he and his grandson-(Periwinkle) celebrate Hanukkah with Steve, Blue, and their friends. Due to his Jewish heritage, he wears a traditional blue Kippah on the back of his head.

References

Bibliography
 Tracy, Diane. (2002). Blue's Clues for Success: The 8 Secrets Behind a Phenomenal Business. New York: Kaplan Publishing. .

Lists of characters in American television animation
Lists of children's television characters